Dapp is a hamlet in central Alberta, Canada within Westlock County.

Demographics 

History 
The community derives its name from the initials of David A. Pennicuick, a railroad official.

In 1985, one of the last two traditional wooden grain elevators in Alberta was built in Dapp by the Alberta Wheat Pool.

Notable residents 

 Greg Polis, professional ice hockey player (National Hockey League), 1970s

See also 
List of communities in Alberta
List of designated places in Alberta
List of hamlets in Alberta

References 

Hamlets in Alberta
Designated places in Alberta
Westlock County